Zafrul Hasan Farhad ( – 18 January 2017) was a Bangladeshi politician from Barguna belonging to Jatiya Party. He was a member of the Jatiya Sangsad.

Biography
Farhad was the president of Barguna District unit of Jatiya Party. He was elected as a member of the Jatiya Sangsad from Barguna-1 in 1988.

Farhad died of cardiac arrest on 18 January 2017 at Sher-e-Bangla Medical College Hospital in Barisal at the age of 64.

References

1950s births
2017 deaths
People from Barguna district
4th Jatiya Sangsad members
Jatiya Party politicians